Teach Children to Worship Satan is a cover album by Dark Funeral. The only release to feature Gaahnfaust on drums.

Tracks two through five were recorded for various tribute albums. "An Apprentice of Satan" was recorded as a preview, and then re-recorded for their next studio album, Diabolis Interium.

Track listing
"An Apprentice of Satan 2000" – 6:05
"The Trial" (King Diamond cover) – 5:26
"Dead Skin Mask" (Slayer cover) – 4:46
"Remember the Fallen" (Sodom cover) – 4:15
"Pagan Fears" (Mayhem cover) – 6:31

Personnel
Lord Ahriman – guitar
Emperor Magus Caligula – vocals, bass
Dominion – guitar
Gaahnfaust – drums

References

External links
Dark Funeral discography
Dark Funeral appearances in tribute albums

2001 albums
Dark Funeral albums
Covers albums